Prvce is a village in the municipality of Tearce, North Macedonia.

Demographics
As of the 2021 census, Prvce had zero residents.

According to the 2002 census, the village had a total of 27 inhabitants. Ethnic groups in the village include:

Albanians 27

References

External links

Villages in Tearce Municipality
Albanian communities in North Macedonia